Osmoderma scabrum is a species in the family Scarabaeidae ("scarab beetles"), in the order Coleoptera ("beetles"). Occurring in eastern North America from Quebec south to Tennessee, it is 14-20 mm long and black, sometimes with a metallic sheen. Adults are nocturnally active and may be found at sap flows or under bark.

References

Further reading
 American Beetles, Volume II: Polyphaga: Scarabaeoidea through Curculionoidea, Arnett, R.H. Jr., M. C. Thomas, P. E. Skelley and J. H. Frank. (eds.). 2002. CRC Press LLC, Boca Raton, Florida.
 
 Peterson Field Guides: Beetles, Richard E. White. 1983. Houghton Mifflin Company.

Cetoniinae
Beetles described in 1805